Telbasta is an unincorporated community in Washington County, Nebraska, United States.

History
A post office was established at Telbasta in 1890 and remained in operation until it was discontinued in 1900.

References

Unincorporated communities in Washington County, Nebraska
Unincorporated communities in Nebraska